Thomas Barlow Smith (October 28, 1839 – July 22, 1933) was a merchant, ship builder, author and political figure in Nova Scotia, Canada. He represented Hants County in the Nova Scotia House of Assembly in 1874, and from 1878 to 1882 as a Liberal and then from 1890 to 1894 as a Liberal-Conservative member.

He was born in Windsor, Nova Scotia, the son of Bennett Smith and Rachel Harris. In 1864, Smith married Azubah Scott. He was elected to the provincial assembly in an 1874 by-election but defeated in the general election that followed later that same year. He died in 1933.

Publications
 Young Lion of the Woods, A Story of Early Colonial Days (1889) also available at http://www.canadiana.org/ECO/mtq?doc=15222
 Backward glances (1898)
 A seraph on the sea, or, The career of a Highland drummer boy (1891)

References 

The Canadian biographical dictionary and portrait gallery of eminent and self-made men ... (1881)

External links 
 
 
 

1839 births
Progressive Conservative Association of Nova Scotia MLAs
Writers from Nova Scotia
People from Windsor, Nova Scotia
1933 deaths